Kolda is a region of Senegal (regional capitals have the same name as their respective regions). It is also referred to historically and popularly as Haute Casamance.

It's one of the 14 regions of the country and is located in the south. It shares borders with Guinea, Guinea-Bissau, The Gambia and its fellow regions of Sédhiou and Tambacounda.

Departments
Kolda region is divided into three departments:
Kolda Département
Médina Yoro Foulah Département
Vélingara Département

References

 
Casamance
Regions of Senegal